Romania competed at the 2012 Summer Olympics in London from 27 July to 12 August 2012. This nation has competed at the Summer Olympic Games since its official debut in 1924, missing only two editions, including the 1948 Summer Olympics. Despite being London's third Olympic Games, this is the first time the Romanian team has competed in London. The Romanian Olympic and Sports Committee (COSR) sent a total of 103 athletes to the Games, 54 men and 49 women, to compete in 14 sports.

Romania left London with a total of 9 medals (2 gold, 5 silver, and 2 bronze), beating the number of medals won in 2008 by one. This performance was considered the nation's worst at an Olympic Games since 1964, based on the gold medal standings. Three of the medals were awarded to the team in artistic gymnastics, two in judo, two in weightlifting (taken away later), and one each in fencing and shooting. Romania did not win an Olympic medal in rowing for the first time since 1976, and in athletics for the first time since 1980. On 25 November 2020 the IOC disqualified two Romanians weightlifters, Răzvan Martin and Roxana Cocoș, for doping and stripped them of their medals.

Among the nation's medalists were gymnasts Sandra Izbașa and Cătălina Ponor, who both won two medals for their individual final exercises (vault and floor). The women's artistic gymnastics team, led by Ponor and Izbașa, also managed to repeat its bronze medal in the all-around event. Rifle shooter Alin Moldoveanu became the first Romanian man to claim the gold medal in a shooting event in 12 years. Meanwhile, Rareș Dumitrescu, who missed out of the bronze medal in men's individual sabre, led his team to win the silver in the men's team sabre fencing competition.

Medalists

| valign="top" |

| valign="top" |

| valign="top" |

Delegation 
Comitetul Olimpic și Sportiv Român (COSR) selected a team of 103 athletes, 54 men and 49 women, to compete in 14 sports, surpassing the record in 2008 by just a single athlete. There was only a single competitor in road cycling.

The Romanian team featured past Olympic champions, four of them defending (marathon runner Constantina Diță, judoka Alina Dumitru, gymnast Sandra Izbașa, and rowing pair Georgeta Andrunache and Viorica Susanu). Eight female Romanian athletes were among the oldest of the team, including discus thrower Nicoleta Grasu, who competed at her sixth Olympics. Georgeta Andrunache became one of the most successful female rowers in Olympic history, with a total of six medals; five of them gold. Andrunache's compatriot, Viorica Susanu, who won a total of five Olympic medals, competed at her fifth Olympics, along with marathon runner Lidia Șimon. Skeet shooter Lucia Mihalache, at age 45, was the oldest athlete of the team, while gymnast Larisa Iordache was the youngest at age 16.

Other notable Romanian athletes included gymnast Cătălina Ponor, who made an Olympic comeback in her sport after eight years, swimmer and former Olympic champion Camelia Potec, who competed at her fourth Olympics, and tennis doubles specialist Horia Tecău, who became the nation's first male flag bearer at the opening ceremony since 1996.

| width=78% align=left valign=top |
The following is the list of number of competitors participating in the Games. Note that reserves for fencing, field hockey, football, and handball are counted as reserves:

Athletics

Romanian athletes achieved qualifying standards in the following athletics events (up to a maximum of 3 athletes in each event at the 'A' Standard, and 1 at the 'B' Standard):

Men
Track & road events

Women
Track & road events

Field events

Boxing

Men

Women

Canoeing

Sprint
Men

Women

Qualification Legend: FA = Qualify to final (medal); FB = Qualify to final B (non-medal)

Cycling

Road

Fencing

Men

Women

Gymnastics

Women's artistic gymnastics was the best sport for Romania at the 2012 Summer Olympics. They won a bronze medal in the team competition, Sandra Izbașa won gold on vault, and Cătălina Ponor won silver on floor. This was the 10th consecutive Olympics that Romania won a medal in the women's artistic gymnastics team competition dating back to 1976; their streak ended at the next Olympics in 2016.

Artistic
Men
Team

Individual finals

Women
Team

Individual finals

Judo 

Men

Women

Rowing

For the first time in 36 years Romania did not win any medals in rowing.

Men

Women

Qualification Legend: FA=Final A (medal); FB=Final B (non-medal); FC=Final C (non-medal); FD=Final D (non-medal); FE=Final E (non-medal); FF=Final F (non-medal); SA/B=Semifinals A/B; SC/D=Semifinals C/D; SE/F=Semifinals E/F; QF=Quarterfinals; R=Repechage

Shooting

Men

Women

Swimming

Romanian swimmers achieved qualifying standards in the following events (up to a maximum of 2 swimmers in each event at the Olympic Qualifying Time (OQT), and potentially 1 at the Olympic Selection Time (OST)):

Men

Women

Table tennis

Romania qualified three athletes for singles table tennis events based on their world rankings as of 16 May 2011. Adrian Crișan qualified for the men's event; Daniela Dodean and Elizabeta Samara qualified for the women's.

Tennis

Water polo

Men's tournament

Team roster

Group play

Weightlifting

Wrestling

Men's freestyle

Men's Greco-Roman

References

Nations at the 2012 Summer Olympics
2012
Summer